= Tea Creek =

Stream in the American state of West Virginia

Coordinates: 38°20′23″N 80°13′53″W

Tea Creek is a stream in the U.S. state of West Virginia.

Tea Creek was so named on account of its water being stained brown like tea.

== See also ==
- List of rivers of West Virginia
